= Smyth M. Miles =

American politician

Smyth M. Miles served in the California legislature and during both the Mexican–American War and the American Civil War he served in the US Army.
